Petacciato is a town and comune in the province of Campobasso (Molise), in southern Italy.

See also
 Molise Croats

References

External links